Co-amilofruse (BAN) is a nonproprietary name used to denote a combination of amiloride and furosemide, which are both diuretics. Co-amilofruse is a treatment for fluid retention (oedema), either in the legs (peripheral edema) or on the lungs (pulmonary oedema). Furosemide is a loop diuretic and is more effective than amiloride, but has a tendency to cause low potassium levels (hypokalaemia); the potassium-sparing effects of amiloride may balance this.

Formulation 
Two strengths of co-amilofruse are available:
 2.5 mg amiloride with 20 mg furosemide, BAN of Co-amilofruse 2.5/20 (brand name Frumil LS)
 5 mg amiloride with 40 mg furosemide, BAN of Co-amilofruse 5/4-0 (brand name Frumil)

References

 British National Formulary 2004

Loop diuretics
Potassium-sparing diuretics
Combination drugs